The Cayenne slender-legged tree frog (Osteocephalus leprieurii), also known as the Cayenne spiny-backed frog,  is a species of frog in the family Hylidae found in northern South America.

References

amphibians described in 1841
amphibians of Guyana
Osteocephalus
taxa named by André Marie Constant Duméril
taxonomy articles created by Polbot